The A71 autoroute is a motorway in central France. It is also called l'Arverne. It starts at Orléans and ends at Clermont-Ferrand.

Orléans to Bourges 

The autoroute is 2x2 lanes and is operated by the Société Cofiroute (Orléans-Bourges). The section between Orléans to Salbris was opened on 24 October 1986. In 1989 it was completed to Bourges.

Junctions  

 Exchange A10-A71 Junction with the A10
 1 (Orléans-Centre)  Towns served: Orléans
 2 (Olivet)  Towns served: Olivet
 Rest Area: Le Bois de Bailly/Le Bois du Télégraphe
 Rest Area:Chaumont-sur-Tharonne/La Ferté-Saint-Aubin
 3 (Lamotte-Beuvron)  Towns served: Lamotte-Beuvron
 Rest Area: L'Étang du Marais/La Briganderie
 Rest Area: Les Marembets/La Saulot
 4 (Salbris)  Towns served: Salbris
 Service Area: Salbris
 Exchange A71-A85 Junction with A85
 Exchange A20-A71 Junction with A20
 6 (Vierzon-Est)  Towns served: Vierzon
 Rest area: Les Croquettes/La Chaussée de César
 Service Area: Bourges
 7 (Bourges)  Towns served: Bourges

Bourges to Clermont-Ferrand 

This section of the autoroute is operated by SAPRR. It is 2x2 lanes and a toll road. The road has the double numbering A71/A89 between Combronde and Gerzat.

 1987 : The section between Montmarault and Clermont-Est (71 km) is opened.
 1988 : The section between Forêt-de-Tronçais and Montmarault (38 km) is opened.
 1989 : The opening of the section between Bourges and the Forêt-de-Tronçais (70 km)

= Junctions  
=

 Rest Area: Le Gîte des Loups/Le Bois des Dames
 Service Area: Centre de la France
 8 (Saint-Amand)  Towns served: Saint-Amand-Montrond
 Rest Area: Le Grand Meaulnes/Vallon-en-Sully
 9 (Vallon-en-Sully)  Towns served: Vallon-en-Sully and Hérisson
 Exchange A714-A71 Junction with the A714 spur to Guéret and Montluçon
 Service Area: L'Allier
 11 (Montmarault)  Towns served: Montmarault
 Rest Area: La Bouble/Chantelle-en-Bourbonnais
 Exchange A71-A719 Junction with A719 spur to Vichy, Gannat and Ébreuil
 Service Area: Volcans
 12.1 (Combronde)  Towns served: Combronde
 Exchange A89-A71 Junction with the A89
 Rest Area: Montpertuis/Pessat-Villeneuve
 13 (Riom)  Towns served: Riom
 14 (Gerzat)  Towns served: Gerzat
 15 (Clermont-Ferrand)  Towns served: Clermont-Ferrand
 Exchange A710-A71 Junction with the A710 spur to
 16 (Brezet)  Towns served: Clermont-Ferrand
 Exchange A75-A71  Junction with A75 to Saint-Étienne and Lyon.

The Spur Autoroutes

A719 

Opened in 1997, first section of this motorway bypasses Gannat by north (9 km). The highway was extended to the gates of Vichy, precisely on a roundabout at Espinasse-Vozelle; this 14 km section, inaugurated 9 January, was opened on 12 January 2015.

 Exchange A71-A719
 13, km 1 Towns served: Ébreuil and Gannat
 14, km 6 Towns served: Gannat and Saint-Pourçain-sur-Sioule 24 km
 15, km 9 Towns served: Gannat and Vichy

There are proposals to extend the autoroute beyond Vichy to form part of the A77 to (Moulins-Roanne).

A710 
Former autoroute opened in 1998 (7 km long). Junctions are:

 Exchange A71-A710 Junction with the A710
 Exchange A89-A710 Junction with the A89 (7 km)

A711 

 Exchange A75-A711 Junction with the A75
 1.3 km 4 Towns served: Lempdes
 1.4 km 5 Towns served: Pont-du-Château
 Exchange A89-A711 Junction with the A89 (11 km)

A712 
This motorway, 1 km long and with reduced features, connects the exit 1.4 of A711 at the roundabout of Champ-Lamet between Lempdes and Pont-du-Château, at the crossroads with three other departmental roads.

A714 

Motorway connecting the A71 with the traffic ring of Montluçon.

Future 

There are proposals to create a major motorway route through Montluçon as part of a transport route from Central Europe to the Atlantic coast.

References

External links

 A71 Motorway in Saratlas (in French)

A71